Meador Valley is a valley in Wayne County in the U.S. state of Missouri.

Meador Valley has the name of Henry Meador, a pioneer citizen.

References

Valleys of Wayne County, Missouri
Valleys of Missouri